Francisco "Paco" Ibáñez (born 20 November 1934 in Valencia) is a Spanish singer and musician. He never composed his own lyrics, but used famous poems, like those of Federico García Lorca, Luis Cernuda, Rafael Alberti or Miguel Hernández. He also sang compositions from Georges Brassens.

Life
He went to France in 1952 and recorded his first album in 1964. 
During the events in France of May 1968, he performed in the Sorbonne and became known as a rebel artist.

Early life
The youngest of four siblings, he was born to a Valencian father and a Basque mother. He spent his first years in Barcelona, only returning there in 1994 after a long exile; his family had had to flee to France after the Spanish civil war due to his father's membership of the anarcho-syndicalist CNT union. They lived in Paris until the beginning of the German occupation of France, when his father was arrested and deported to an internment camp for Spanish Republican prisoners. His mother took their four children back to San Sebastián to find work, and they lived together in her family's ancestral home in Aduna, Guipuzkoa, until he was 14.

Discography
Paco Ibanez Vol.1 (1964)
Paco Ibanez Vol.2 (1967)
Paco Ibanez Vol.3 (1969)
A Flor de Tiempo (1978)
Canta Brassens (1979)
Por Una Cancion (1990)
Oroitzen (1999)
Canta a Jose A Goytisolo (2002)
Fue Ayer (2003)

Live
En el Olympia (1969)
A galopar (1991)

References

External links 

 Official site
 Music City (Complete discography
 Video in Valldoreix (Barcelona)
 Paco Ibáñez in Biografías y vidas

1934 births
Living people
University of Paris people
People from Valencia
Musicians from the Valencian Community
Spanish musicians